Southern Sandstone is a local name for the Ardingly Sandstone of southeast England, a soft sandstone of Cretaceous age separating the Tunbridge Wells Sands from the overlying Grinstead Clay. The outcrops in the Weald of Kent are the rock climbing crags closest to London and are probably the most heavily climbed in the UK.

Geology
The horizon of thick, cross-bedded, fine-to-medium grained quartz sandstone separating the Tunbridge Wells Sands from the overlying Grinstead Clay is known as Ardingly Sandstone. It is particularly well exposed throughout the region between East Grinstead, West Sussex, and Tunbridge Wells, Kent.

Climbing
Stone Farm and Harrisons Rocks are managed by the British Mountaineering Council (BMC). The rock is particularly soft and care needs to be taken to prevent erosion. It is climbed either solo or on a top-rope. Many bolts have been placed at the top of the crags. Soloing requires no more equipment than bouldering.

Locations
Southern Sandstone is outcrops of sandstone situated in the Weald of Kent, on the borders of Kent and East Sussex.

Major Outcrops
Bowles Rocks, Harrisons Rocks, High Rocks, High Rocks Continuation Wall and High Rocks Annexe near Crowborough
Bull's Hollow Rocks west of Tunbridge Wells
Chiddinglye Rocks near West Hoathly
Eridge Green Rocks in Eridge Green, four miles south of Tunbridge Well
Stone Farm Rocks south of East Grinstead

Minor Outcrops
Basset's Farm Rocks, near Cowden
Chiddinglye Wood Rocks near West Hoathly
Happy Valley Rocks west of Tunbridge Wells
Ramslye Farm Rocks, south of High Rocks
Jockey's Wood Rocks, Penn's House Rocks, and Rocks Wood are in Penn's Rocks near Eridge. This is a SSI and climbing is not allowed.
Under Rockes, south of Rotherfield

References

External links
Code of Practice for climbing on southern sandstone
Harrisons Rocks Management Group
Sandstone Volunteers Group
Bowles Outdoor Centre
Bowles Rocks Bouldering Guide
Wealden Sandstone
Southern Sandstone Climbs
Ye Olde Southern Sandstone & UKCrags archived sites from 2007
Tunbridge Wells Mountaineering Club
Southern Sandstone Climbing Crags on Google Maps

Further reading
Southern Sandstone and the Sea Cliffs of the South-East England by Mike Vetterlein and Robin Mazinke, 2008, 
Southern Sandstone Bouldering by James O'Neil and Ben Read, 2011, 
Sandstone - Climbing in South East England by David Atchison-Jones, 2010, 

Climbing areas of England
Sport in Kent
Sport in East Sussex
Geology of Kent
Landforms of East Sussex
Rock formations of England